= The Plan Collection =

- Company type: Private
- Industry: House plans
- Headquarters: Scarsdale, New York
- Key people: Brian Toolan (CEO)
- Website: www.theplancollection.com

The Plan Collection is an American e-commerce company that sells pre-drawn house plans to homeowners and professional builders. The Plan Collection was acquired in 2011 by its parent company, TPC Interactive.

== History ==
The founders of TPC Interactive entered the house plans business in the 1970s, first offering black and white house plan books that contained approximately 100 pre-drawn house plans. As its network of architects expanded, the company increased the length of the catalogs and partnered with retailers Barnes & Noble, Home Depot and Lowe’s to distribute the house plan books. By the end of the 1990s, the company tested CD-ROM house plan catalogs with mixed success. The Plan Collection website was launched in 2000 in what the company claims to be one of the first house plan websites.

The company currently claims to provide homeowners and builders with more than 20,000 house plans selected from leading designers and architects. The website also features tens of thousands of photos and renderings of the house plans. In 2014, The Plan Collection introduced the ability for customers to 3D print select house plans.
